Magic Tree may refer to:
"Magic Tree" (single), the 2007 single by musician Kirsten Price
Little Trees, a disposable air freshener known as "Magic Tree" in the UK until 2011
The Magic Tree (TV Series), a Polish television program for children
L'arbre enchanté (The Magic Tree), an opéra comique by Christoph Willibald Gluck

See also 
 Magical Tree, a 1984 video game